Ingram Yuzek Gainen Carroll & Bertolotti, LLP (full name: Ingram Yuzek Gainen Carroll & Bertolotti, LLP) is a law firm based in New York City. Ingram Yuzek Gainen Carroll & Bertolotti, LLP was founded in 1989 when five partners spun off from New York law firm Shea & Gould. Ingram Yuzek has more than 30 lawyers practicing in 15 practice areas.

Legal Services 
Ingram Yuzek Gainen Carroll & Bertolotti, LLP is a full service law firm providing a broad range of transactional and dispute resolution services in practice areas including: antitrust, commercial litigation, construction and design, corporate and commercial, creditors' rights, intellectual property, interior and product design, IT and e-commerce, labor and employment, landlord and tenant, privacy and information management, real estate and taxation. The firm also has an Asia practice group and a general counsel group.

Rankings and recognition 
Ingram Yuzek Gainen Carroll & Bertolotti, LLP is a "New York Area Top Ranked Firm," based on the number of its lawyers having achieved the LexisNexis® Martindale-Hubbell® AV® Preeminent™ Peer Review RatingSM.
Ingram Yuzek is the New York representative of the Legal Netlink Alliance, an association of small, midsized, general practice and independent law firms, the goal of which is to establish a presence in all major cities across the country and in other parts of the world.

References

External links 
Official Website
Criminal Defense Attorney

Law firms based in New York City
1989 establishments in New York City